Alan Jacobson (born 12 November 1942) is an Australian former cricketer. He played one first-class match for Tasmania in 1968/69.

See also
 List of Tasmanian representative cricketers

References

External links
 

1942 births
Living people
Australian cricketers
Tasmania cricketers
Cricketers from Sydney